
Year 906 (CMVI) was a common year starting on Wednesday (link will display the full calendar) of the Julian calendar.

Events 
 By place 

 Europe 
 February 27 – Battle of Fritzlar: The Conradines defeat the Babenberg counts, to establish themselves as dukes of Franconia (modern-day Bavaria). Count Conrad the Elder is killed in the battle, his son Conrad the Younger becomes duke of Franconia.
 Summer – Duke Mojmir II halts the advance of the plundering Hungarians under Grand Prince Árpád in Great Moravia (approximate date).

 Britain 
 King Constantine II of Scotland calls for an assembly to meet at Scone. Scottish Christian clergy under Bishop Cellach pledges that the laws and disciplines of the faith, and the laws of churches and gospels, should be kept pariter cum Scottis.

 Arabian Empire 
 October 22 – Abbasid commander Ahmad ibn Kayghalagh leads a raid against the Byzantine Empire from Tarsus, joined by the governor Rustam ibn Baradu. He reaches the Halys River and takes 4,000–5,000 captives.

 Asia 
 January 22 – The warlord Zhu Quanzhong secretly puts Empress Dowager He, the wife of the late Emperor Zhaozong and mother of the reigning Emperor Ai, to death (by strangulation) and has her defamed and posthumously demoted to commoner rank.

 Armenia 
906 K'argop' earthquake. It took place in the monastery K'argop', Armenia. The monastery was also known as Xotakerk', the monastery of the Vegetarians. The earthquake occurred approximately 150 years following the 735 Vayots Dzor Province earthquake, and affected the same region.

Births 
 June 21 – Abu Ja'far Ahmad ibn Muhammad, Saffarid emir (d. 963)
 Abu Tahir al-Jannabi, Qarmatian ruler (d. 944)
 Fujiwara no Atsutada, Japanese nobleman (d. 943)
 Guan Tong, Chinese landscape painter (approximate date)
 Liu Congxiao, Chinese general (d. 962)
 Majolus of Cluny, Frankish abbot (approximate date)
 Nasr II, Samanid emir (d. 943)
 Sherira Gaon, Jewish spiritual leader (d. 1006)

Deaths 
 January 22 – He, empress of the Tang Dynasty
 January 27 – Liu Can, chancellor of the Tang Dynasty
 February 27 – Conrad the Elder, Frankish nobleman
 September 9 – Adalbert von Babenberg, Frankish nobleman
 Acfred I, Frankish nobleman (approximate date)
 Dae Wihae, king of Balhae (Korea)
 Tughj ibn Juff, Abbasid governor
 Zhong Chuan, Chinese warlord

References

Sources